Manitoba Provincial Road 465 is a provincial road in the southwestern section of the Canadian province of Manitoba.

Route description 

PR 465 is an east–west provincial road that begins at PR 262 and travels to its eastbound terminus with PR 464 near the unincorporated community of Mentmore.

The road provides access to the unincorporated community of Cordova, where it is the southbound terminus for PR 466.

PR 465 is a gravel road for its entire length.

History 
In the early 1990s, the Manitoba government decommissioned a number of provincial secondary roads and returned the maintenance of these roads back to the rural municipalities. A small portion of the original PR 465 was included in this decommissioning.

From this point, it continued east to its terminus with PTH 5 (PR 258 prior to 1980).

This section is now a municipal road.

References

External links 
Manitoba Official Map - Southwest
 

465